Nagri may refer to:
 Nagri, Chhattishgarh, a town in Chhattishgarh, India
 Nagri, Jharkhand, a village in Jharkhand, India
 Nagri block, an administrative unit of Ranchi district in Jharkhand, India
 a variant of the name "Nagari", which may refer to several writing systems:
Nāgarī script, a script used in India during the first millennium
Devanagari, a script used since the late first millennium and currently in widespread use for the languages of northern India
Nandinagari, a script used in southern India from the late first millennium until the 19th century
Sylheti Nagari, a script used in the Sylhet area of Bangladesh and nearby parts of India

See also 
 Nagari (disambiguation)